Thomas John Karl Showler (born November 1932) is a director of the International Bee Research Association and an author on beekeeping. Showler was president of the British Bee Keepers Association 1989-90. He resides in Brecon in Wales. With his late wife Betty, Showler was a partner in B & K Books of Hay on Wye.

Selected publications
Practical bee-keeping. Ward Lock, London, 1977. (With Herbert Mace)  
The observation hive. Bee Books New & Old, Steventon, 1978. 
Some hints on the art and mystery of skep making. Northern Bee Books, 1990.
Swarming: Its control & prevention. Bee Books Old & New, Burrowbridge, 1995. 
Tales from the Wye. 2000. (Illustrated by Ben McKee) 
Essays in beekeeping history. BeeCraft, Warwickshire, 2011. 
Honey bee drone congregations. Central Association of Bee-Keepers, Upminster, 2012. 
James Atlay. Hereford's forgotten bishop a private study. 1868-1894. Karl Showler, 2012.

References

External links
http://www.lagergaard.dk/books/rev/shwatsonpastiche.html

Living people
British instructional writers
British beekeepers
1932 births